John Maxwell Roberts FREng, FIStructE, FICE, FCGI is a British structural engineer. He was president of the Institution of Structural Engineers (IStructE) in 2003-2004 and the 2005 recipient of their Gold Medal.

Early life and education 
Roberts was born in Bristol. He graduated from the University of Sheffield with a BEng (1969) and a PhD (1972) in Civil & Structural Engineering.

Career 
After his PhD, Roberts worked on motorway interchanges with McAlpine & Sons then in 1974 moved to Bertram Done & Partners and soon after to Allott & Lomax in Manchester as a design engineer. It was there where he worked on Big One (roller coaster). Babtie took over Allott & Lomax in 2000 and Jacobs took over Babtie in 2004. Since then Roberts has been Director of Operations at Jacobs Engineering Group. 
Roberts was responsible for the engineering of the London Eye and British Airways i360

Awards and honours 
Roberts was awarded the Gold Medal of the Institution of Structural Engineers in 2005 and an Hon DEng by the University of Sheffield in 2006.

References

Year of birth missing (living people)
Living people
Fellows of the Royal Academy of Engineering
Presidents of the Institution of Structural Engineers
British structural engineers
IStructE Gold Medal winners
Alumni of the University of Sheffield
Engineers from Bristol